Archaeosynthemis is a genus of dragonflies in the family Synthemistidae. 
Species of Archaeosynthemis are found across southern Australia.
They are medium-sized dragonflies with black and yellow markings.

Species
The genus Archaeosynthemis includes the following species:
 Archaeosynthemis leachii  - Twinspot tigertail
 Archaeosynthemis occidentalis  - Western brown tigertail
 Archaeosynthemis orientalis  - Eastern brown tigertail
 Archaeosynthemis spiniger  - Spiny tigertail

See also
 List of Odonata species of Australia

References

Synthemistidae
Anisoptera genera
Odonata of Australia
Endemic fauna of Australia
Taxa named by Frank Louis Carle
Insects described in 1995